Endophytus is a genus of sawflies belonging to the family Tenthredinidae.

The species of this genus are found in Europe.

Species:
 Endophytus anemones (Hering, 1924)

References

Tenthredinidae
Sawfly genera